Bardwell may refer to:

Places

Australia 
 Bardwell Park, New South Wales
 Bardwell Valley, New South Wales
 Bardwell Park railway station, Sydney

United Kingdom 
 Bardwell Road
 Bardwell, Suffolk
 Bardwell Windmill, a tower mill

United States 
 Bardwell, Texas
 Lake Bardwell
 Bardwell, Kentucky
 Bardwell, Wisconsin
 Bardwell's Ferry Bridge, an 1882 lenticular truss bridge in Massachusetts

People with the surname
 Hilary Bardwell
 Keith Bardwell, former Louisiana justice of the peace who refused to officiate a wedding in the 2009 Louisiana interracial marriage incident
 Leland Bardwell (1922–2016), Irish poet, novelist and playwright
 Robert Bardwell, former Jacobs Field organist
 Sherman Bardwell (1828–1900), American politician
 Tennyson Bardwell, writer/director
 Elisabeth Bardwell (1831–1899), American astronomer
 Thomas Bardwell (1704–1767), English portrait and figure painter, art copyist, and writer

Fictional characters
 Jeffrey & William Bardwell, twin fictional characters in the CBS soap opera The Young and the Restless

See also
 1615 Bardwell, an asteroid discovered at Goethe Link Observatory